Taherabad-e Mian (also Romanized as Ţāherābād-e Mīān; also known as Ţāherābād-e Mīāneh and Qal‘eh-ye Mīān) is a village in Pasakuh Rural District, Zavin District, Kalat County, Razavi Khorasan Province, Iran. At the 2006 census, its population was 46, in 17 families.

References 

Populated places in Kalat County